Eva Mortensen (born 12 September 1970) is a Danish swimmer. She competed in the women's 400 metre freestyle and women's 800 metre freestyle events at the 1988 Summer Olympics.

References

External links
 

1970 births
Living people
Olympic swimmers of Denmark
Swimmers at the 1988 Summer Olympics
Sportspeople from Palo Alto, California
Danish female freestyle swimmers